L'Isle-Adam – Parmain is a railway station in the commune of Parmain (Val-d'Oise department), France. The station is served by two Transilien H lines: Creil–Pontoise and Paris–Saint-Leu-la-Forêt–Persan-Beaumont. The daily number of passengers was between 500 and 2,500 in 2002.

Bus connections

Busval d'Oise: 95.07 and 95.16

See also
List of SNCF stations in Île-de-France

References

External links

 

I
I